Abigail Selina Boyd is an Australian politician living on the Central Coast in New South Wales. She has been a member of the New South Wales Legislative Council since 2019, representing the Greens.

Boyd was a corporate lawyer specialising in global banking regulation before her election.

Boyd's areas of policy interest include climate change, economic inequality, domestic and family violence, animal welfare, disability and young people.

Early life and career
Boyd was born in England and moved to Australia as a young child. She attended public schools in New South Wales, before graduating from Macquarie University in 1995 with a Bachelor of Arts (Psychology), and from the University of New South Wales in 1999 with a Bachelor of Laws. She is qualified to practise law in New South Wales, England and Wales.

Boyd worked as a Solicitor at Mallesons Sydney from 1998 to 2003, at Blake Dawson Sydney from 2003 to 2004, and at Freshfields in London from 2004 to 2005. She was a Capital Products Structurer at UBS Investment Bank in London from 2005 to 2006, and then worked as a Counsel at Allen & Overy (in London and then Sydney) from 2007 to 2018. As a lawyer, Boyd's areas of expertise included global banking regulation and structured capital markets products issued by banks, insurers and corporates across Europe, Asia and Australia. She had a particular interest in financial stability and the manner in which financial crises increase economic inequality, and is a published author on the topic of bank bail-ins.

During 2008, Boyd worked on the frontline of the global financial crisis in London. This experience has been critical in her work on reducing economic inequality and developing a progressive economy.

Political career
Boyd held various roles within the Greens before being elected to the NSW Parliament, including National Secretary of the Australian Greens (2017–18) and National Deputy Secretary of the Australian Greens (2016–17). She was the Australian Greens candidate in 2016 for the federal seat of Dobell, and the Greens NSW candidate in the 2017 Gosford state by-election.

Boyd was preselected to the second position on the Greens' upper house ticket and elected to the New South Wales Legislative Council in the 2019 New South Wales state election.

Boyd is currently the Chair of NSW Parliament's Portfolio Committee No. 6 - Transport and Customer Service, Deputy Chair of the Regulation Committee and a member of Portfolio Committee No. 1 - Premier and Finance, the Legislation Review Committee, the Standing Committee on Social Issues, the Selection of Bills Committee, the Public Works Committee, the Select Committee on the Greyhound Welfare and Integrity Commission and the Joint Select Committee on Coercive Control.

On 6 June 2019, Boyd successfully moved a motion requiring the NSW Government to produce documents related to the sale of Eraring and Vales Point power stations. Following the production of those documents, Boyd was successful in establishing an inquiry into residual costs to the NSW Government resulting from those sale arrangements.

In 2019, she fought to revoke the approvals given to the Wallarah 2 coal mine near Wyong with the Central Coast Drinking Water Catchments Protection Bill 2019. The Bill was negatived in November 2019.

In 2020, Boyd put forward a motion pushing for the "complete decarbonisation of our economy and a transition to a jobs-rich future powered by 100 percent renewable energy", done through a Just Transition framework.

In early 2020, she launched a universal basic income initiative known as the Universal Wellbeing Payment.

After giving notice in June 2020, Boyd introduced the '' in November 2020. The Bill, which Boyd consulted on for over a year, seeks to change the law to recognise coercive control as domestic abuse.

In March 2021, Boyd put forward a motion to address sexual assault and harassment in the NSW Parliament, including requiring sexual consent training for all staff, which passed unopposed.

References

 

Year of birth missing (living people)
Living people
Members of the New South Wales Legislative Council
Australian Greens members of the Parliament of New South Wales
21st-century Australian politicians
Women members of the New South Wales Legislative Council
Macquarie University alumni
University of New South Wales Law School alumni
Australian solicitors
21st-century Australian women politicians